S1600 may refer to:

 PV-S1600, a Casio Pocket viewer model 
 Super 1600, 2001 rally car formula